Born–von Karman boundary conditions are periodic boundary conditions which impose the restriction that a wave function must be periodic on a certain Bravais lattice.  Named after Max Born and Theodore von Kármán, this condition is often applied in solid state physics to model an ideal crystal.  Born and von Karman published a series of articles in 1912 and 1913 that presented one of the first theories of specific heat of solids based on the crystalline hypothesis and included these boundary conditions. 

The condition can be stated as

 

where i runs over the dimensions of the Bravais lattice, the ai are the primitive vectors of the lattice, and the Ni are integers (assuming the lattice has N cells where N=N1N2N3).  This definition can be used to show that

 

for any lattice translation vector T such that:

 

Note, however, the Born–von Karman boundary conditions are useful when Ni are large (infinite). 

The Born–von Karman boundary condition is important in solid state physics for analyzing many features of crystals, such as diffraction and the band gap.  Modeling the potential of a crystal as a periodic function with the Born–von Karman boundary condition and plugging in Schrödinger's equation results in a proof of Bloch's theorem, which is particularly important in understanding the band structure of crystals.

However, since any real crystal always has a finite size, the electronic states in the crystal do not satisfy the Born–von Karman boundary condition. Consequently, the conventional theory of electronic states in crystals based on the Bloch's theorem has some fundamental difficulties.

References

Condensed matter physics
Boundary conditions
Max Born